The 2018 Lithuanian Football Cup, also known as LFF Cup, was the seventy-third season of the Lithuanian annual football knock-out tournament. Forty-eight teams entered the competitions, which started on 27 April and ended on 30 September.

The winners qualify for the 2019–20 UEFA Europa League. Stumbras were the defending champions.

Participants
Participation in the competition is mandatory for all clubs of the first three tiers (A Lyga, LFF I Lyga and II Lyga). Despite that NFA aren't competing for the second year in a row. Teams of lower divisions are eligible to join if they met additional criterios. Rules prevented all reserve teams from entering the cup.

{| class="wikitable" style="text-align:left"
|-
!A Lyga
!width=140|LFF I Lyga
!II Lyga
!III Lyga
!IV Lyga
|-
|valign=top|
Stumbras (holders)
Žalgiris
Sūduva
Trakai
Jonava
Atlantas
Kauno Žalgiris
Palanga
|valign=top|
Banga
Vilniaus Vytis
DFK Dainava
Džiugas
Koralas
Nevėžis
Pakruojis
Panevėžys
Utenis
Kupiškis
|valign=top|
South Zone
Ateitis
BFA
Hegelmann Litauen
Panerys
Šilas
Sveikata
TERA
Viltis

West Zone
Gargždų Pramogos SC
Šilutė
Širvėna
FA Šiauliai
Babrungas
Minija
Atmosfera Mažeikiai
Akmenės Cementas
Saned
|valign=top|
Alytus County
Merkys

Kaunas County
Kėdainiai

Klaipėda County
Sakuona-Rugpienių kaimas

Marijampolė County
Švyturys

Šiauliai County
Saulininkas-OBLT
ŠSPC Radviliškis
Adiada

Vilnius County
Elektrėnų Versmė
Navigatoriai
VGTU Vilkai
Kaišiadorys-Baltai
|valign=top|
A Division
Geležinis Vilkas

B Division
Top Kickers
|}

Schedule
The rounds of the 2016–17 competition were scheduled as follows:

Matches

First round
The following pairs were drawn on 20 April 2017 by Lithuania national team midfielder Saulius Mikoliūnas. Dates and venues will be confirmed after the draw.

Nevėžis, Pakruojis (I Lyga), Babrungas, Hegelmann Litauen, Gargždų Pramogos SC, Saned (II Lyga), Elektrėnų Versmė (III Lyga) and Top Kickers (IV Lyga) received free passes to the next round.

Round of 32

Round of 16

Quarter-finals

Semi-finals

Final
The final match was played on Sunday 30 September 2018.

See also

Leagues
 2018 A Lyga
 2018 LFF I Lyga

Cups
 2018 Lithuanian Supercup

References

2018
Cup
2017–18 European domestic association football cups
2018–19 European domestic association football cups